The 2016–17 FSV Frankfurt season is the 118th season in the football club's history. After being relegated from the 2015–16 2. Bundesliga, FSV Frankfurt now play in the 3. Liga. They also participated in this season's edition of the domestic cup, the DFB-Pokal. The season covers a period from 1 July 2016 to 30 June 2017.

Players

Squad

Competitions

3. Liga

League table

Results summary

Results by round

Matches

DFB-Pokal

References

External links
FSV Frankfurt at worldfootball.net

FSV Frankfurt seasons
Frankfurt, FSV